Qila, alternatively transliterated as Kilaa, is an Arabic word meaning a fort or castle. The term is also used in various Indo-Iranian languages. Qila often occurs in place-names.

India
Forts
Aligarh Qila
Rohtas Qila
Allahabad Qila
Chittorgarh Qila
Gohad Qila
Hatras Qila
Lal Qila (Agra)
Lal Qila - literally Red Fort in Delhi, India
Purana Qila, Delhi
Qila Rai Pithora, Delhi, established 12th-century
Qila Mubarak
Sasni Qila
Shahi Qila, Jaunpur
Place-names
Qila Raipur

Pakistan
Forts
Shahi Qila, Lahore
Place-names
Arkot Qila
Azim Qila
Besham Qila
Hisara Kasan Ali Qila
Hisara Sarbiland Khan Qila
Khuni Qila
Mughal Qila
Sakhakot Qila in Malakand Agency
Sāsoli Qila
Qila Didar Singh
Qila Ladgasht
Qila Mihan Singh
Qila Safed
Qila Saifullah in Balochistan
Qila Sheikhupura
Qila Tara Singh
Qila Sobha Singh
Qila Sura Singh

Other
Qila, Hebron, Palestinian territories

See also
Kala (disambiguation), alternate spelling of qala ("fortress") in Persian
Qala (disambiguation), alternate spelling of qala ("fortress")
Qalat (disambiguation), disambiguation page for places whose names contain the words Qalat, Qelat, Kalat, Kalaat, Kalut, or Kelat

Castles by type
Fortifications in Pakistan
Fortifications in India